Thijs van Amerongen (born 18 July 1986 in Warnsveld) is a Dutch former professional road and cyclo-cross cyclist. He represented his nation in the men's elite event at the 2016 UCI Cyclo-cross World Championships  in Heusden-Zolder.

Major results

Cyclo-cross

2003–2004
 1st  National Junior Championships
 Junior Superprestige
1st Saint-Michel-Gestel
2006–2007
 1st  National Under-23 Championships
2007–2008
 1st Overall Under-23 Superprestige
1st Diegem
1st Hamme-Zogge
 1st Krawatencross Under-23
2009–2010
 3rd Centrumcross Surhuisterveen
2011–2012
 2nd National Championships
 3rd Cyclo-cross Heerlen
2012–2013
 2nd Centrumcross Surhuisterveen
 3rd National Championships
 9th UCI World Championships
2013–2014
 2nd Cyclo-cross Heerlen
 2nd International Cyclocross Finance centrum
 2nd Centrumcross Surhuisterveen
 3rd National Championships
2014–2015
 1st Grand-Prix de la Commune de Contern
 1st Kiremko Nacht van Woerden
2015–2016
 6th European Championships
2017–2018
 1st Int. Radquerfeldein GP Lambach
 3rd Qiansen Trophy Yanqing

Road
2003
 4th Trofeo comune di Vertova
2004
 1st Stage 4 Int. Junioren Driedaagse van Axel
 1st Mountains classification, Oberösterreich Juniorenrundfahrt
 2nd Circuit de la Région Wallonne
 3rd Time trial, National Junior Road Championships

References

External links
 

1986 births
Living people
Cyclo-cross cyclists
Dutch male cyclists
People from Warnsveld
Cyclists from Gelderland
20th-century Dutch people
21st-century Dutch people